KADM may refer to:

 KADM-LP, a defunct low-power television station (channel 63) formerly licensed to Corpus Christi, Texas, United States
 Ardmore Municipal Airport (ICAO code KADM)